The following television stations operate on virtual channel 24 in the United States:

 K08PT-D in Bakersfield, California
 K09XW-D in Palm Desert, etc., California
 K19LY-D in Scipio, Utah
 K20OH-D in Ardmore, Oklahoma
 K24AG-D in Trapper Creek, Alaska
 K24CH-D in Cortez, etc., Colorado
 K24CY-D in St. George, Utah
 K24HH-D in Wichita Falls, Texas
 K24JV-D in St. James, Minnesota
 K24KT-D in Walker, Minnesota
 K24KV-D in Logan, Utah
 K24NA-D in Delta, Utah
 K25PE-D in Decorah, Iowa
 K29MP-D in Garrison, Utah
 K31ND-D in Oroville, California
 K31NJ-D in Lansing, Iowa
 K32OV-D in Lubbock, Texas
 K33KW-D in Delta, etc., Utah
 KAAP-LD in Santa Cruz, California
 KBCB in Bellingham, Washington
 KCCX-LD in Corpus Christi, Texas
 KFTA-TV in Fort Smith, Arkansas
 KGMM-CD in San Antonio, Texas
 KJHP-LD in Morongo Valley, California
 KKFX-CD in San Luis Obispo, California
 KLPB-TV in Lafayette, Louisiana
 KLTS-TV in Shreveport, Louisiana
 KMLN-LD in Fort Collins, Colorado
 KNDM in Minot, North Dakota
 KNLC in St. Louis, Missouri
 KNMT in Portland, Oregon
 KNVN in Chico, California
 KOMI-CD in Woodward, Oklahoma
 KPEJ-TV in Odessa, Texas
 KPJC-LD in San Francisco, California
 KPNZ in Ogden, Utah
 KQUP in Pullman, Washington
 KRMZ in Steamboat Springs, Colorado
 KRUM-LD in Seattle, Washington
 KSAS-TV in Wichita, Kansas
 KSEE in Fresno, California
 KVCR-DT in San Bernardino, California
 KVUE in Austin, Texas
 KYCW-LD in Branson, Missouri
 KYIN in Mason City, Iowa
 KZSA-LD in San Angelo, Texas
 W02CY-D in New York, New York
 W18EN-D in Sion Farm, St Croix, U.S. Virgin Islands
 W19EP-D in Culebra, Puerto Rico
 W21EA-D in Parkersburg, West Virginia
 W22CV-D in Moorefield, West Virginia
 W22DO-D in Utica, New York
 W23DR-D in Romney, West Virginia
 W24CP-D in Durham, North Carolina
 W24DB-D in Clarks Summit, Pennsylvania
 W24EI-D in Naranjito, Puerto Rico
 W24ET-D in Atlantic City, New Jersey
 W24EX-D in Florence, South Carolina
 W24FB-D in Brazil, Indiana
 W24FC-D in Augusta, Georgia
 W27EE-D in Martinsburg, West Virginia
 W27EJ-D in Sterling, Illinois
 W30CO-D in Wheeling, West Virginia
 W35DQ-D in Midland, Michigan
 W41DK-D in Keyser, West Virginia
 WASA-LD in Port Jervis, New York
 WATN-TV in Memphis, Tennessee
 WCNY-TV in Syracuse, New York
 WDDA-LD in Chattanooga, Tennessee
 WDGT-LD in Miami, Florida
 WDLH-LD in Evansville, Indiana
 WDTT-LD in Knoxville, Tennessee
 WEAC-CD in Jacksonville, Alabama
 WEDH in Hartford, Connecticut
 WEQT-LD in Gainesville, Georgia
 WFXZ-CD in Boston, Massachusetts
 WGXA in Macon, Georgia
 WILT-LD in Wilmington, North Carolina
 WJET-TV in Erie, Pennsylvania
 WJPX in San Juan, Puerto Rico
 WKYU-TV in Bowling Green, Kentucky
 WMDN in Meridian, Mississippi
 WMYO-CD in Louisville, Kentucky
 WNPB-TV in Morgantown, West Virginia
 WNPX-LD in Nashville, Tennessee
 WNWO-TV in Toledo, Ohio
 WPHA-CD in Philadelphia, Pennsylvania
 WPVN-CD in Chicago, Illinois
 WQPT-TV in Moline, Illinois
 WTAT-TV in Charleston, South Carolina
 WTBM-CD in Birmingham, Alabama
 WTLF in Tallahassee, Florida
 WUCF-TV in Orlando, Florida
 WUTB in Baltimore, Maryland
 WVTV-DT2 in Milwaukee, Wisconsin
 WWEO-LD in Defuniak Springs, Florida
 WXOD-LD in Palm Beach, Florida
 WZBJ in Danville, Virginia
 WZBJ-CD in Lynchburg, Virginia

The following stations, which are no longer licensed, formerly operated on virtual channel 24 in the United States:
 K24IQ-D in Billings, Montana
 K24JI-D in Hermiston, Oregon
 K24KD-D in Salix, Iowa
 KIJK-LD in Lincoln, Nebraska
 KRUB-LD in Cedar Rapids, Iowa
 KXLJ-LD in Juneau, Alaska
 W07DN-D in Wardensville, etc., West Virginia
 W09CT-D in Mathias, etc., West Virginia
 W24BB-D in East Stroudsburg, Pennsylvania
 W24DE-D in Miami, Florida
 W24DM-D in Gainesville, Florida
 W24DN-D in Clarksburg, West Virginia
 WDLP-CD in Pompano Beach, Florida
 WLNN-CD in Boone, North Carolina
 WODX-LD in Springfield, Illinois

References

24 virtual